(for the American sound film on Edith Cavell, see Nurse Edith Cavell)

The Woman the Germans Shot, also known as The Cavell Case, is a 1918 American silent war biographical film based on the life and career of Nurse Edith Cavell. It was directed by John G. Adolfi and starred stage star Julia Arthur in her screen debut. It was released the month before World War I ended.

Plot
As described in a film magazine, Edith Cavell (Arthur) is beloved by George Brooks (Brooks), but decides to follow the dictates of her conscious and nurse the sick and suffering. George goes to war. Years later they meet again, he now a blinded middle-aged man with a fine young son Frank (Hale) who is in love with a beautiful girl. For old times sake Edith becomes George's nurse when a delicate operation is performed that restores his sight. World War I breaks out and she returns to Belgium where she teaches other nurses. After the Germans take possession of the hospital and throw the British soldiers in the foul cellar, Edith often slips down there to dress their wounds. She is discovered and abused by the Germans. They have her watched, but in spite of them finds young Frank Brooks there and helps him escape, sending her message for all England to fight. She is arrested, tried, and, despite the efforts of civilized nations to save her, executed. Her shooting helps raise an army that will fight to prevent similar atrocities.

Cast

See also
The Martyrdom of Nurse Cavell (1916)
Nurse Cavell (1916)
Dawn (1928)
Nurse Edith Cavell (1939)

Preservation
With no prints of The Woman the Germans Shot located in any film archives, it is a lost film.

References

External links

1918 films
American silent feature films
Films directed by John G. Adolfi
Lost American films
American black-and-white films
American war drama films
American biographical drama films
1910s war drama films
1910s biographical drama films
Selznick Pictures films
1918 lost films
Lost war drama films
1918 drama films
1910s American films
Silent American drama films
Silent war drama films
1910s English-language films